is a railway station in the city of Gujō, Gifu Prefecture, Japan, operated by the third sector railway operator Nagaragawa Railway.

Lines

Station layout
Minami-Kodakara-Onsen Station has one ground-level side platform serving a single bi-directional track. The station building also contains an onsen, which passengers on the Nagaragawa Railway can use at a discount. The station is staffed.

Adjacent stations

|-
!colspan=5|Nagaragawa Railway

History
Minami-Kodakara-Onsen Station was opened on April 4, 2002.

Surrounding area
Nagara River

See also
 List of Railway Stations in Japan

References

External links

 

Railway stations in Japan opened in 2002
Railway stations in Gifu Prefecture
Stations of Nagaragawa Railway
Gujō, Gifu